Rohit Bakshi (born 14 February 1982) is an Indian entrepreneur and a former 3x3 Professional Basketball player from Delhi. He is the CEO of YKBK Enterprise Private Limited and Commissioner of 3BL, the FIBA-affiliated 3x3 Pro Basketball League in the Indian Subcontinent.

Early life 
Rohit Bakshi was born in Delhi, India, and grew up in Nagoya, Japan. He started playing 3x3 league in 2006 and has played in the Japanese 3x3 league. Rohit returned to India in 2009 to set up a professional basketball league in India.

Career 
In 2016, Rohit started Agleymina.EXE, a 3x3 basketball team along with a Japanese businessman Yoshiya Kato, which aims to show the strength of Indian players as well as to win a Championship in Japan. They won the 3x3 Japan Premier League Championship title and lost in the final of the World Tour Final Championship in 2016. In the following year, Rohit Bakshi and Yoshiya Kato set up a 3x3 Pro Basketball League in India named 3BL, which is recognized by the International Basketball Federation (FIBA) and consists of eighteen teams including international players.

References

External links 
 Rohit Bakshi

1982 births
Living people
Indian sportspeople
People from Delhi